Leaving Friday Harbor, an album by The Battlefield Band, was released in 1999 on the Temple Records label.

Track listing
Clan Coco/The Road to Benderloch/Fifteen Stubbies to Warragul - 3:49
The Last Trip Home - 4:59
It's Nice to be Nice/The Auld Toon Band/McCabe's Reel - 4:26
The Straw Man - 4:51
Leaving Friday Harbor - 5:16
The 24th Guards Brigade at Anzio/The Melbourne Sleeper/McRae's of Linnie - 3:55
One More Chorus - 4:49
The Pleasure Will be Mine - 4:04
Something for Jamie - 3:35
The Sister's Reel/Marion & Donald/The Lassie with the Yellow Petticoat/Jesse "The Body" Ventura's Reel - 3:46
Logie O' Buchan - 5:53

Personnel

Battlefield Band
 Alan Reid (keyboards, guitar, vocals, writing...)
 Davy Steele (lead vocals, writing...) 
 John McCusker (fiddle, whistle...) 
 Mike Katz (Highland pipes, small pipes, various whistles...)

Sources and links
 

Battlefield Band albums
1999 albums